The Scotland Cemetery is a historic cemetery in Scotland, an unincorporated community in rural Union County, Arkansas. The cemetery was formally established in 1861, but had been used as a burying ground since the first settlers arrived in the area in the 1840s. It is the only tangible remnant of the community's early days; the nearby church is the third to stand on the site. The earliest grave with a known date is 1842; the cemetery has more than 30 unmarked graves, including some that are probable graves of slaves.

The cemetery was listed on the National Register of Historic Places in 2005, at which time it was still open for additional burials.

See also
 National Register of Historic Places listings in Union County, Arkansas

References

External links
 

Cemeteries on the National Register of Historic Places in Arkansas
National Register of Historic Places in Union County, Arkansas
Presbyterianism in Arkansas
1842 establishments in Arkansas
Cultural infrastructure completed in 1842
Presbyterian cemeteries in the United States
Cemeteries established in the 1840s